José Eliseo Fleitas Villalba (born November 7, 1986 in Bella Vista Norte, Paraguay) is a Paraguayan footballer currently playing for Naval of the Primera B Chilena.

Teams
  Cruz del Sur de Bariloche 2007-2009
  Deportivo Roca 2010-2012
  Textil Mandiyú 2012
  Naval 2013–present

References
 
 
 

1986 births
Living people
Paraguayan footballers
Paraguayan expatriate footballers
Naval de Talcahuano footballers
Primera B de Chile players
Expatriate footballers in Chile
Expatriate footballers in Argentina
Association footballers not categorized by position